Karthikeya Murthy is an Indian composer, singer-songwriter and music producer. A BAFTA Breakthrough India Talent. He made his debut in Tamil/Telugu bilingual movie Moone Moonu Varthai/Moodu Mukkallo Cheppalante (2015). He is known for his score in the movie KD (a) Karuppudurai.

Personal life
Karthikeya was trained in Carnatic Classical Music by Chengalpet Ranganathan, DKJ.Sukanya, Premalatha and in Western Classical music by Abdul Sattar. Karthikeya is the grandson of ace mridangam player T.K.Murthy. His father T.K.Jayaraman was a music composer at All India Radio, Chennai. 
He is the 7th generation musician in his family with his musical roots tracing to Bowdeeshwara Bagavathar (Carnatic Singer), Thanu Bhagavathar (Carnatic Singer), Subramaniya Bhagavathar (Carnatic Singer), Thanu Subramaniya Bhagavathar (Violinist), Dr.T.K.Murthy (mridangam) and T.K.Jayaraman (Music Composer). His early ancestors were court musicians. He is married to Dr. Praveena Raman.

Career
He began his career in music by forming a band in school known as Pro-teens which was later renamed to Madras Tunes for a band hunt competition in Sun TV. He then ventured into short films, ad films, documentaries as an independent composer before getting into films. As a part of Madras Tunes he won the band hunt show "Oh La La La" conducted by renowned music director A.R.Rahman and music label Saregama. Post winning and recording an album in Rahman's studio, he went on to write music for ace director K.Balachander's last stage show "Oru Koodai Paasam" under the stage name "Karthik Iyer". The music of the show was well appreciated with Hindu reviewing the music as "lilting and one of the good production values". He further did more theater works including the one for Dancer Dhananjayans and Olliyum Oliyum production's INSTINCT. Also he worked on several short films including the critically acclaimed Thuvandha Yuddham, Jagathinai Azhithidivom to name a few.

Acclaimed producer/singer/actor S.P.Charan met Karthikeya while recording a song for a college project that led him to rope Karthikeya as a composer in his production Moone Moonu Varthai directed by Madhumita - a bilingual (in Telugu Moodu Mukkallo Cheppalante). At the single launch show of the Moone Moonu Varthai, veteran singer S. P. Balasubrahmanyam for the very first time performed a song from the movie with Karthikeya on Piano during which he compared his music-composing prowess to that of Oscar-winning music director A.R.Rahman.

Karthikeya has composed title track & theme music for Vijay Television Tamil mythological serial Tamil Kadavul Murugan being aired from 2 October 2017 and actor Vijay Sethupathi starrer Namma Ooru Hero in Sun TV.

Discography 

MOVIES

TV SERIES

THEATRE WORKS

NOTABLE SINGLES

Awards & Recognitions 

 2021 - BAFTA Breakthrough (India) Honoree - BAFTA
 2021 - Special Mention Original Score (Sweetness) - FICOCC 
 2021 - Honorable Mention Original Score (Sweetness) - SFAAF

References

External links
 

Alumni of Trinity College of Music
Living people
Tamil musicians
Tamil film score composers
Tamil singers
1985 births